Valery Pavlovich Bulyshev (15 June 1939 – 15 August 2013) was a Soviet middle-distance runner who won a silver medal in the 800 m at the 1962 European Championships. He competed in the same event at the 1960 and 1964 Olympics, but failed to reach the finals.

Bulyshev was born in Crimea, but lived most of his life in Saint Petersburg. Between 1959 and 1966 he won 8 Soviet titles and set 12 Soviet records in middle-distance events. In retirement he worked as athletics coach.

References

1939 births
2013 deaths
Russian male middle-distance runners
Olympic athletes of the Soviet Union
Athletes (track and field) at the 1960 Summer Olympics
Athletes (track and field) at the 1964 Summer Olympics
European Athletics Championships medalists
Soviet male middle-distance runners